Victor Coroller (born 29 January 1997 in Rennes) is a French athlete specialising in the 400 metres and 400 metres hurdles. He represented his country at the 2017 World Championships reaching the semifinals. Earlier, he won a bronze medal at the 2014 Summer Youth Olympics.

His personal best in the 400 m is 47.07 seconds outdoor set in Stadio Comunale, Bellinzona, Switzerland on 28 July 2022. In 2023, he ran 47.01 indoors in Metz. His personal best in the 400 m hurdles is 49.11, which he ran in La Chaux-de-Fonds in 2022.

International competitions

References

1997 births
Living people
French male hurdlers
World Athletics Championships athletes for France
Sportspeople from Rennes
Athletes (track and field) at the 2014 Summer Youth Olympics
21st-century French people